Langwith is an area in the Bolsover District of Derbyshire, England.  The area contains four listed buildings that are recorded in the National Heritage List for England.  Of these, one is listed at Grade II*, the middle of the three grades, and the others are at Grade II, the lowest grade.  The area contains a number of small settlements, including Upper Langwith, and the listed buildings consist of a church, a small country house, a cottage, and a former school and schoolmaster's house, later used as a village hall.


Key

Buildings

References

Citations

Sources

 

Lists of listed buildings in Derbyshire